The Puerto Rican skink (Spondylurus nitidus) is a species of skink found in Puerto Rico.

References

Spondylurus
Reptiles described in 1887
Reptiles of the Caribbean
Endemic fauna of the Caribbean
Taxa named by Samuel Garman